James William Welford (27 March 1869 – 17 January 1945) was an English cricketer and footballer. He won both the Football League (three times) and FA Cup with Aston Villa, and the Scottish Football League and Scottish Cup with Celtic, all in a seven-year period in the 1890s.

In cricket, Welford was a right-handed batsman who bowled right-arm fast.

Football
Welford was born in Barnard Castle, County Durham; his playing position was as a full-back. He had played locally for Stockton and Bishop Auckland before joining Birmingham St George's, from where he joined Aston Villa in 1893. He played there until 1897, making a total of 83 appearances in both League and Cup, scoring one goal.

From Aston Villa Welford moved to Celtic in Scotland, being enticed north along with teammates John Campbell and Jack Reynolds. He played for Celtic for three seasons and won the Scottish Football League in 1897–98, followed by the Scottish Cup in 1899, followed swiftly by the Glasgow Merchants Charity Cup, both knockout trophies won by way of 2–0 victories over local rivals Rangers. He later had spells in the Irish League with Belfast Celtic and Distillery, and with Hamilton Academical in Scotland's lower division, adding a 1903–04 Scottish Division Two winner's medal to his collection.

Cricket

Welford made his debut for Durham in the 1895 Minor Counties Championship against Cheshire. He made five further appearances in that season for the county. He joined Warwickshire for the 1896 season, making his first-class debut for the county in the County Championship against Surrey. He made 12 further first-class appearances in 1896, the last of which came against Hampshire. In this thirteen first-class appearances for Warwickshire, he scored 459 runs at an average of 21.85, with a high score of 118. This score, which was his only first-class century, came against Leicestershire. With the ball, he took 2 wickets at a bowling average of 90.00, with best figures of 1/13.

He died in Paisley, Scotland on 17 January 1945.

References

External links
James Welford at ESPNcricinfo
James Welford at CricketArchive

1869 births
1945 deaths
People from Barnard Castle
English cricketers
Durham cricketers
Warwickshire cricketers
English footballers
Stockton F.C. players
Bishop Auckland F.C. players
Aston Villa F.C. players
Celtic F.C. players
English Football League players
Association football fullbacks
Scottish Football League players
FA Cup Final players
Footballers from County Durham
NIFL Premiership players
Lisburn Distillery F.C. players
Belfast Celtic F.C. players
Hamilton Academical F.C. players